The Wake (also known as Veillée funèbre) is a 1986 Canadian drama film directed by Norma Bailey and written by Sharon Riis. The film was produced by the National Film Board of Canada and was part of the organization's "Daughters of the Country" series, which looked at the lives of Métis women.

Plot 
Set in Alberta, The Wake centers around a love affair that forms between a Canadian police officer and a young Métis woman.

Starring 

 Victoria Snow as Joan Laboucane                                                                       
 Diane Debassige as Donna Desjarlais
 Timothy Webber as Jim Whalen
 Michelle Thrush as Marlene

References

External links

Canadian drama films
1986 films
Films directed by Norma Bailey
English-language Canadian films
1980s Canadian films